Hannah Snell (23 April 1723 – 8 February 1792) was a British woman who disguised herself as a man and became a soldier.

Hannah Snell was mentioned in James Woodforde's diary entry of 21 May 1778 selling buttons, garters, and laces.

Biography 
Hannah Snell was born in Worcester, England on 23 April 1723. She was the youngest daughter of her family, with five sisters and three brothers. Locals claim that she played a soldier even as a child.

In 1740, after the death of her parents, she moved to London to live with her sister. She married James Summes, a Dutch seaman, on 18 January 1744. Towards the end of Snell's pregnancy with their daughter, her husband abandoned her, leaving her in debt. Her daughter, Susannah, died a year later. Snell borrowed a man's suit from her brother-in-law James Gray, assumed his name, and began to search for Summes. She later learned that her husband had been executed for murder. According to her account, following the death of her daughter, on 23 November 1745, she joined John Guise's regiment, the 6th Regiment of Foot, in the army of the Duke of Cumberland against Bonnie Prince Charlie.

She deserted when her sergeant gave her 500 lashes and moved to Portsmouth and joined the Marines. She boarded the ship Swallow at Portsmouth and sailed to Lisbon. Her unit was about to invade Mauritius, but the attack was called off. Her unit then sailed to India.

In August 1748, her unit was sent to an expedition to capture the French colony of Pondicherry in India. Later, she also fought in the battle in Devicottail in June 1749. She was wounded in the legs eleven times.

She was also shot in her groin and, to avoid revealing her sex, she instructed a local woman to take out the bullet instead of being tended by the regimental surgeon.

In 1750, her unit returned to Britain and traveled from Portsmouth to London, where she revealed her sex to her shipmates on 2 June. She petitioned the Duke of Cumberland, the head of the army, for her pension. She also sold her story to London publisher Robert Walker, who published her account, The Female Soldier, in two different editions. She also began to appear on stage in her uniform presenting military drills and singing songs. Three painters painted her portrait in her uniform and The Gentleman's Magazine reported her claims. She was honourably discharged and the Royal Hospital, Chelsea officially recognized Snell's military service in November, and granted her a pension in 1750 (increased in 1785), a rare thing in those days.

Snell retired to Wapping and began to keep a pub named The Female Warrior (or The Widow in Masquerade, accounts disagree) but it did not last long. By the mid-1750s, she was living in Newbury in Berkshire. In 1759, she married Richard Eyles there, with whom she had two children. In 1772, she married Richard Habgood of Welford, also in Berkshire, and the two moved to the Midlands. In 1785, she was living with her son George Spence Eyles, a clerk, on Church Street, Stoke Newington.

In 1791, her mental condition suddenly worsened. She was admitted to Bethlem Hospital on 20 August and died on 8 February 1792. She was buried at Chelsea Hospital (now the Old Burial Ground, Royal Hospital Chelsea).

Cultural references

Playwright Shirley Gee has written two fictional dramatisations of Snell's life: a radio play, Against the Wind (1988) and a stage play, Warrior (1989).

Hannah Snell is mentioned in the 1969 film The Prime of Miss Jean Brodie as a woman who was prepared to "serve, suffer and sacrifice."

References

Further reading
 Matthew Stephens - Hannah Snell: The Secret Life of a Female Marine, 1723–1792

External links

Hannah Snell Homepage
Excerpts from Hannah Snell: The Secret Life of a Female Marine, 1723-1792 by Matthew Stephens
Royal Berkshire History: Hannah Snell
 

1723 births
1792 deaths
Female wartime cross-dressers
Women in the British Army
Royal Marines ranks
Military personnel from Worcester, England
18th-century English women